Dimla RBR Govt. High School more fully known as Dimla Rani Brindarani Government High School is a secondary school located at Dimla Upazila in Nilphamari District, Bangladesh.

The school was established in 1917. Md. Abdur Razzak is currently the head teacher of the school.

References

Schools in Nilphamari District
1917 establishments in India
Educational institutions established in 1917